Justin Jenkins (born December 10, 1980) is a former American football wide receiver. He was signed by the Philadelphia Eagles as an undrafted free agent in 2004. He played college football at Mississippi State.

Jenkins also played for the Hamburg Sea Devils and Buffalo Bills.

Professional career

Philadelphia Eagles
Jenkins was signed by the Philadelphia Eagles as an undrafted free agent following the 2004 NFL Draft on April 27, 2004. He was waived on September 5 and subsequently signed to the practice squad on September 6. He was re-signed to a future contract on February 10, 2005. He suffered a torn anterior cruciate ligament during a preseason game on August 20 and placed on injured reserve on August 28. He was released on September 2, 2006.

Hamburg Sea Devils
Jenkins played for the Hamburg Sea Devils in NFL Europa for one season and led his team to the World Bowl Championship. He finished the season with 39 receptions for 583 yards (14.95 yards per reception avg.) and two touchdowns. In the World Bowl game, he made 7 receptions for 74 yards and a touchdown.

Buffalo Bills
Jenkins was signed by the Buffalo Bills on June 29, 2006. He was released on September 1, 2007 and was subsequently re-signed to the practice squad on September 6. He was promoted to the active roster on October 19. He was re-signed on February 17, 2008 to a multi-year contract. He was released on September 14 and re-signed on September 17. He was waived once again on February 16, 2010.

External links
Buffalo Bills bio

1980 births
Living people
People from Pearl, Mississippi
Players of American football from Mississippi
American football wide receivers
Mississippi State Bulldogs football players
Philadelphia Eagles players
Hamburg Sea Devils players
Buffalo Bills players